Roze's gecko (Gonatodes rozei), also known commonly as limpiacasa (meaning "house cleaner" in Spanish), is a species of lizard in the family Sphaerodactylidae. The species is endemic to Venezuela.

Etymology
The specific name, rozei, is in honor of Latvian-American herpetologist Janis Roze.

Geographic range
G. rozei is found in northern Venezuela, in the Venezuelan states of Anzoátegui, Guárico, Miranda, and Vargas.

Habitat

Description

References

Further reading
Rivero-Blanco C, Schargel WE (2012). "A strikingly polychromatic new species of Gonatodes (Squamata: Sphaerodactylidae) from northern Venezuela". Zootaxa 3518: 66–78. (Gonatodes rozei, new species).
Señaris JC, Aristeguieta MM, Rojas H, Rojas-Runjaic FJM (2018). Guía ilustrada de los anfibios y reptiles de la valle de Caracas, Venezuela. Caracas: Ediciones IVIC (Instituto Venezolano de Investigaciones Scientíficos). 348 pp. . (in Spanish).

Gonatodes
Reptiles described in 2012